Botanical gardens in Cuba have collections consisting entirely of Cuba native and endemic species; most have a collection that include plants from around the world. There are botanical gardens and arboreta in all states and territories of Cuba, most are administered by local governments, some are privately owned.

 Cuban National Botanic Garden, Havana
 Jardín Botánico de Cienfuegos, Cienfuegos (also known as Jardín Botánico Soledad)
 Jardín Botánico Cupaynicu, Granma Province
 Jardín de los Helechos de Santiago de Cuba, Santiago de Cuba
 Instituto de Investigaciones Fundamentales en Agricultura Tropical „Alejandro de Humboldt“, Havana
 Jardín Botánico Orquideario Soroa, Candelaria, Cuba
 Jardín Botánico de Pinar del Río, Pinar del Río
 Jardín Botánico de Sancti Spiritus, Sancti Spíritus
 Estación experimental de plantas medicinales Dr. Juan T. Roig  
 Jardín Botánico de Holguín
 Jardín Botánico de Matanzas
 Jardín Botánico de Villa Clara

References 

Cuba
Botanical gardens